George Hartness (18 December 1872 – 1943) was an English professional footballer who played as an inside forward for Sunderland.

References

1872 births
1943 deaths
Footballers from Sunderland
English footballers
Association football inside forwards
Monkwearmouth F.C. players
Sunderland A.F.C. players
English Football League players